Helen Mahon-Stroud (born 15 April 1968) is a New Zealand netball coach and former rugby union player.

Biography

Rugby career 
Mahon-Stroud began her rugby career in 1989. She was introduced to the sport by Black Ferns legend Anna Richards who was also her Canterbury netball teammate. She captained the first New Zealand women’s rugby team in 1989, against the California Grizzlies side in Christchurch.

Mahon-Stroud represented New Zealand at the inaugural 1991 Women's Rugby World Cup in Wales. She is credited as scoring the first women's Rugby World Cup try.

In 2018, Mahon-Stroud was one of 46 former Black Ferns who were presented with a test cap.

Netball coaching career 
In 2008, Mahon-Stroud was appointed head coach of the Canterbury Tactix in the ANZ Championship. Canterbury finished in seventh place during the 2008 season, with five wins and eight losses. She was retained as coach for the 2009 season. She coached the Tactix for two more seasons, ending in 2011.

Cricket management 
In addition to rugby and netball, Mahon-Stroud was team manager and high performance manager of the New Zealand women's national cricket team, the White Ferns, for over three years. She was first appointed as the White Ferns team manager in 2013.

Mahon-Stroud's husband, Alan Stroud, is a former All Whites international. She has been a member of the New Zealand Police for more than twenty years, and is working on becoming a detective.

References

External links
Black Ferns Profile

Living people
New Zealand netball coaches
New Zealand police officers
ANZ Championship coaches
New Zealand women's international rugby union players
New Zealand female rugby union players
1968 births